Affinity Publisher is a desktop publishing application developed by Serif for macOS and Microsoft Windows (with an iPadOS version being developed). It is a part of the Affinity product line along with Affinity Photo and Affinity Designer.

Overview 
Affinity Publisher serves as a successor to Serif's own PagePlus software, which the company discontinued in August 2017 to focus on the Affinity product range. It has been described as an alternative to Adobe InDesign, due to its primary focus on desktop publishing workflows for both printed and online media, including common features from this industry, such as master pages, OpenType support, linked text frames, and end-to-end support for the CMYK color model.

Affinity Publisher includes StudioLink technology, developed by Serif, which allows owners of Affinity Designer and Affinity Photo to use the vector and raster graphic editing functionality of those applications for editing content directly within Publisher (in addition to its own, smaller set of native vector and raster editing features).

File format support 
File formats supported by Affinity Publisher (in addition to the Affinity suite's native file format) include Adobe InDesign Markup Language (IDML), Adobe Photoshop PSD, PDF, JPG, TIFF, PNG, and EPS, with export functionality for the PDF/X-1a, PDF/X-3, PDF/X-4 standards of the PDF/X file format.

The iPadOS editions of Affinity Photo and Designer also include support for Affinity Publisher files.

Development 
The first promotional video for Affinity Publisher was shown by Serif in December 2017, demonstrating features such as the drag & drop functionality, and text flow between frames. A free public beta of the software was made available for both macOS and Windows on August 30, 2018.

The first full version of Publisher (using the 1.7 version number, to align with other Affinity products) was first released on June 19, 2019, in conjunction with Serif's 2019 'Affinity Live' event, during which the company also announced the StudioLink integration features for the first time. Publisher was made available for purchase directly from Serif's website and also available from the Mac App Store and Microsoft Store.

Publisher was updated to version 1.8 in February 2020, introducing support for importing Adobe InDesign's IDML file format.

Serif stated that an iPadOS version of the software was planned for release in 2020.

Reception 
Affinity Publisher received generally favorable reviews following its initial release in 2019, with the application's range of features, its StudioLink integration with Affinity Designer/Photo, and non-subscription pricing model commonly cited as positive areas. Limitations noted by reviewers of the initial release included its lack of support for InDesign's document (INDD) & markup (IDML) files (although Serif added IDML support in February 2020), for footnotes & endnotes, and for GREP-based and nested styles.

Many reviews drew comparisons between Publisher and InDesign, often noting that Publisher's first release did not have all of the features required to serve as a full replacement; however, CreativePro also acknowledged it as having additional tools that are not present in InDesign or other desktop publishing applications.

In December 2019, Apple named Publisher the “Mac App of the Year”.

References

External links 
 

Desktop publishing software
2019 software
Windows graphics-related software
MacOS graphics-related software
MacOS graphics software